Arnett is an unincorporated community in White River Township, Washington County, Arkansas, United States. It is located on Arkansas Highway 74.

A post office called Arnett was established in 1883, and remained in operation until 1951. The community has the name of its first postmaster, Luke Arnett.

References

Unincorporated communities in Washington County, Arkansas
Unincorporated communities in Arkansas
1883 establishments in Arkansas